Kim Chung-Han (born 3 February 1950) is a South Korean former volleyball player who competed in the 1972 Summer Olympics and in the 1976 Summer Olympics.

References

1950 births
Living people
South Korean men's volleyball players
Olympic volleyball players of South Korea
Volleyball players at the 1972 Summer Olympics
Volleyball players at the 1976 Summer Olympics
Asian Games medalists in volleyball
Volleyball players at the 1970 Asian Games
Volleyball players at the 1974 Asian Games
Medalists at the 1970 Asian Games
Medalists at the 1974 Asian Games
Asian Games silver medalists for South Korea
20th-century South Korean people